Maria Rusescu (born 7 September 1936) is a Romanian painter.

Biography

Early life
Rusescu's parents, Filaret and Zamfira Andrişan, moved to Iaşi from Northern Bukovina at the beginning of 1940. Maria Rusescu was a textile engineer (graduating in 1959 from Institutul Politehnic Iaşi) who worked for SC IAŞICOMF SA Iaşi, from where she retired in 1990.

Artistic career
Rusescu's first paintings, dated 1974, are reproductions, in particular, after the work of Theodor Aman. Later, she became fascinated by the work of artist Constantin Daniel Stahi, whom she considered a spiritual mentor.
As a result, Rusescu established the "Constantin Daniel Stahi" Foundation in 1993 in Iași, coordinating its activities until 2007. After 1990 she participated in several local and national (Romanian) exhibitions.

Influenced by the works of Stahi, Rusescu's paintings oscillate between a native sincerity and the attempt to accurately represent, in a classical manner, religious objects or peasant traditional subjects enveloped in a particular light, creating the appearance of a world long gone where everything contained perfection and equilibrium.

Recognition 

 1990: , Group exhibition, Aleea Clasicilor, Chişinău, Moldova, 3rd Prize at Annual Salon of the Asociaţia Artiştilor Plastici from Iaşi.
 1994: 3rd Prize "Arthur Verona" Artists Exhibition, Minerva Gallery, Dorohoi.
 2000: 2nd Prize for the painting "Mama" (The Mother) at the Asociaţia Artiştilor Plastici Iaşi Spring Salon.
 2003: 3rd Prize for the painting "Moara, gîştele şi noi" (The mill, the geese and us) at the Asociaţia Artiştilor Plastici Iaşi Spring Salon, "Casa Cărţii" Gallery, Iaşi.

References

 Gheorghe Bălăceanu: Să ne cunoaştem artiştii în viaţă. Editura Timpul, Iaşi, 2001.
 Gheorghe Bălăceanu: Fragmente de suflet pentru suflet. Editura PIM, Iaşi, 2005.
 Artists Association of Iasi, Romania - Asociația Artiștilor Plastici Iași aapIASI.ro.

1936 births
Living people
20th-century Romanian women artists
21st-century Romanian women artists
People from Chernivtsi Oblast
Romanian illustrators
Romanian painters
Romanian women illustrators
Romanian women painters